The International Aerial Robotics Competition (IARC) began in 1991 on the campus of the Georgia Institute of Technology and is the longest running university-based robotics competition in the world. Since 1991, collegiate teams with the backing of industry and government have fielded autonomous flying robots in an attempt to perform missions requiring robotic behaviors never before exhibited by a flying machine. In 1990, the term “aerial robotics” was coined by competition creator Robert Michelson to describe a new class of small highly intelligent flying machines.  The successive years of competition saw these aerial robots grow in their capabilities from vehicles that could at first barely maintain themselves in the air, to the most recent automatons which are self-stable, self-navigating, and able to interact with their environment—especially objects on the ground.

The primary goal of the competition has been to provide a reason for the state of the art in aerial robotics to move forward.  Challenges set before the international collegiate community have been geared towards producing advances in the state of the art at an increasingly aggressive pace. From 1991 through 2009, a total of six missions have been proposed. Each of them involved fully autonomous robotic behavior that was undemonstrated at the time and impossible for any robotic system fielded anywhere in the world, even by the most sophisticated military robots belonging to the super powers.

In October 2013 a new seventh mission was proposed.  As with previous missions, the Mission 7 involves totally autonomous flying robots, but this is the first IARC mission to involve the interaction between multiple ground robots and even simultaneous competition between two aerial robots working against each other and against the clock to influence the behavior and trajectory of up to ten autonomous ground robots.

In 2016, the International Aerial Robotics Competition and its creator were officially recognized during the Georgia legislative session in the form of "Senate Resolution 1255” which recognized it as the longest running aerial robotics competition in the world and for having been responsible for moving forward the state of the art in aerial robotics on several occasions during the past quarter century.

History

First mission

The initial mission to move a metallic disc from one side of an arena to another with a completely autonomous flying robot was seen by many as almost impossible. The college teams continued to improve their entries over the next two years when the competition saw its first autonomous takeoff, flight, and landing by a team from the Georgia Institute of Technology. Three years later in 1995 a team from Stanford University was able to acquire a single disk and move it from one side of the arena to the other in a fully autonomous flight—half a decade earlier than some pundits had predicted.

Second mission
The competition mission was then toughened and made a bit less abstract by requiring teams to search for a toxic waste dump, map the location of partially buried randomly oriented toxic waste drums, identify the contents of each drum from the hazard labels found somewhere on the outside of each drum, and bring a sample back from one of the drums—all without any human intervention whatsoever.

In 1996 a team from the Massachusetts Institute of Technology and Boston University, with backing from Draper Labs, created a small fully autonomous flying robot that repeatedly and correctly mapped the location of all five of the toxic waste drums, and  correctly identified the contents of two from the air, thereby completing approximately seventy five percent of the mission. The following year, an aerial robot developed by a team from Carnegie Mellon University completed the entire mission.

Third mission

The third mission was begun in 1998. It was a search and rescue mission requiring fully autonomous robots to take off, fly to a disaster area and search for survivors and the dead amid raging fires, broken water mains, clouds of toxic gas, and rubble from destroyed buildings. The scenario was recreated at the U.S. Department of Energy's Hazardous Material Management and Emergency Response (HAMMER) training facility where the above hazards could be recreated. Because of the realism of the scenario, animatrons were used instead of human actors to simulate survivors incapable of extracting themselves from the disaster area.

An aerial robot from Germany's Technische Universität Berlin was able to detect and avoid all of the obstacles (many of which could have destroyed the robot itself), identify all the dead on the ground and the survivors (distinguishing between the two based on movement), and relay pictures of the survivors along with their locations back to first responders who would attempt a rescue.  This mission was completed in 2000.

Fourth mission
The fourth mission was initiated in 2001. This fully autonomous mission involved three scenarios requiring the same autonomous behavior.
 The first scenario was a hostage rescue mission where a submarine 3 kilometers off the coast of a third world nation must send in an aerial robot to find a coastal city, identify the embassy where the hostages are being held, locate valid openings in the embassy building, enter (or send in a sensor probe/subvehicle) and relay pictures of the hostages back 3 km to the submarine prior to mounting an amphibious assault on the embassy to free the hostages.
 The second scenario revolved around the discovery of an ancient mausoleum by archaeologists. An ancient virus contained in the mausoleum has quickly killed all the archaeological team, but prior to their death they radioed that a very important and undocumented tapestry is hanging inside. The local government is planning to cleanse the area with a fuel-air explosion in 15 minutes, so the scientists will send in an autonomous aerial robot to find the mausoleum, enter it (or send in a sensor probe/subvehicle) and relay pictures of the tapestry back prior to the destruction of the mausoleum and its contents.
 The third scenario involved an explosion at a nuclear reactor facility which shuts down two of three reactors. Everyone is killed in the disaster and scientists must send in an aerial robot to find the operating reactor building, enter the building (or send in a sensor probe/subvehicle) and relay pictures of the control panels to determine if a melt-down is imminent. The scientists are forced to maintain a 3 kilometer stand-off distance due to the extreme radiation hazard.

All three missions involve the same elements:
 Rapid ingress over a 3 km path
 Location of a building complex
 Location of a specific building within the complex
 Identification of valid openings in that building
 Entry into the building by the aerial robot or a sensor-carrying subvehicle
 Relay of pictures from within back to the launch point 3 km away
 Mission completion within 15 minutes
 Full autonomy throughout all aspects of the mission

This fourth IARC mission was conducted at the U.S. Army's Fort Benning Soldier Battle Lab using the McKenna MOUT (Military Operations on Urban Terrain) site, which replicates a complete German village created for war gaming when the main cold war threat was perceived to come through the Fulda Gap into Germany. The fourth mission was completed in 2008 with various teams having already demonstrated all of the required aerial robotic behaviors mandated by the fourth mission rules, except being able to demonstrate these behaviors seamlessly in under 15 minutes—a feat considered by the organizer and judges to be inevitable given a bit more time, and therefore no longer a significant challenge. Thus the fourth mission was terminated, $80,000 in awards distributed, and the fifth mission established.

A virtual representation of the McKenna MOUT site was developed by the Army Research Laboratory in 2002 for soldier training and experimentation.

Fifth mission

The fifth mission picked up where the fourth mission left off by demonstrating the fully autonomous aerial robotic behaviors necessary to rapidly negotiate the confined internal spaces of a structure once it has been penetrated by an air vehicle. The nuclear reactor complex explosion scenario of the fourth mission was used as the backdrop for the fifth mission. The fifth mission required a fully autonomous aerial vehicle (presupposed to have been launched from a "mothership" just outside the structure as demonstrated during the fourth mission) to penetrate the structure and negotiate the more complex interior space containing hallways, small rooms, obstacles, and dead ends in order to search for a designated target without the aid of global-positioning navigational aids, and relay pictures back to a monitoring station some distance from the structure.   The First Symposium on Indoor Flight Issues was held in conjunction with this 2009 IARC event.

Sixth mission
The sixth mission began in 2010 as an extension of the fifth mission theme of autonomous indoor flight behavior, however the sixth mission demanded more advanced behaviors than were currently possible by any aerial robot extant in 2010. This espionage mission involved covertly stealing a flash drive from a particular room in a building, for which there was no a priori knowledge of the floor plan, and depositing an identical drive to avoid detection of the theft. The 2010 Symposium on Indoor Flight Issues was held concurrently at the University of Puerto Rico - Mayagüez during the 20th anniversary competition. The Official Rules for the 6th Mission are available at the Competition web site.

Seventh mission

The seventh mission began in 2014 demanding more advanced behaviors than were currently possible by any aerial robot extant in 2014. The mission involves autonomous aerial robots controlling autonomous ground robots tactually.  The mission is divided into mission 7a and 7b.  Mission 7a requires a single autonomous aerial robot to herd as many of the 10 autonomous ground robot targets as possible, across the green boundary line in under 10 minutes.  The arena is 20m x 20m (65.62 feet x 65.62 feet) and has a green boundary line at one end, a red boundary line at the opposite end, and white sidelines.  The pattern on the floor of the arena is unknown to the aerial robot designers a priori, however it is known that there is a 1m x 1m (3.28 feet x 3.28 feet) white square grid pattern overlaid upon the arena.  Other than what is seen on the arena floor, there are neither walls for SLAM mapping nor GPS availability.  Techniques such as optical flow or optical odometry are possible solutions to navigation within the arena.

In addition to the 10 ground robot targets, there are 4 "tall" robot obstacles (as much as 2m (6.56 feet in height) which circulate within the arena.  Collisions with obstacle ground robots ends the run with no score.  The (non obstacle) ground robot targets automatically reverse direction every 20 seconds and have up to 20° of noise applied to their trajectories at 5 second intervals.  If an aerial robot touches the ground robot on top with a magnet, the ground robot will turn clockwise 45°.  If the aerial robot blocks its forward motion by landing in front of it, the ground robot targets will reverse direction.  Ground robot targets that feely escape the arena count against the aerial robot's team score.  The autonomous aerial robots must decide which ground robots are in imminent danger of crossing any boundary but the green one, and redirect them toward the green boundary.

Five of the 10 ground robot targets are green and 5 are red.  Mission 7b pits the best teams from 7a against each other, one on one, to get as many of its own green ground robots across the green boundary while misdirecting the opponent's red ground robots.  Similarly, the opponent is trying to get as many of its red ground robots across the red boundary while misdirecting the opponent's green ground robots.

The Official Rules for the 7th mission are available at the Competition web site.  In addition, a video derived from the August 2014 events held at the American Venue (the Georgia Institute of Technology's McAmish Pavilion) and Asia/Pacific Venue (Yantai China), explains the details of mission 7 graphically.  On 28 September 2018 the overall winner of mission 7 was announced as Zhejiang University.  Details can be found at the Official IARC website along with a video of the winning flight by Zhejiang University  and in Beihang University press release.  In all, 52 teams from 12 nations were entered as competitors for mission 7.

Eighth mission

In 2018, the 27th year of the International Aerial Robotics Competition, the 8th mission was announced.

The Official Rules for the 8th mission are available at the Competition web site  along with a video summarizing the 8th mission.  Mission 8 focuses on non-electronic human-machine interaction for the first time, with four aerial robots assisting humans to complete tasks that one person cannot independently accomplish.  The gist of mission 8 involves a swarm of autonomous aerial robots working with a human to achieve a task in the presence of hostile Sentry aerial robots which are autonomously trying to impede the human.  The Sentry robots carry lasers (similar to those used in Laser tag) which will disable the human and end the run after a specified number of “hits”.  The task is structured so that it can not be achieved by the human without the assistance of the swarm of aerial Helpers that are directed only by the human's gestures and voice commands.

In 2018, the inaugural year of mission 8, the American Venue was held on the campus of the Georgia Institute of Technology in Atlanta, Georgia, and the Asia/Pacific Venue was conducted at Beihang University in Beijing China.  In 2019, Mission 8 was successfully completed in Kunming China at the Yunnan Innovation Institute of Beihang University in under 8 minutes by three teams. Of those, Nanjing University of Aeronautics and Astronautics (NUAA) was able to complete the mission in 5 minutes and 6 seconds, representing the fastest completion time. Completing the mission within 10 seconds of NUAA, was Sun Yat Sen University. Harbin Institute also completed the mission, but did so with only 12 seconds remaining on the clock. By completing the mission in the least time, NUAA won the grand prize of $10,000.  Details of the winning performances can be found at the Official IARC website along with a video of the winning flight by NUAA

Ninth mission

In 2021, the 30th year of the International Aerial Robotics Competition, the 9th mission will commence.  The Official Rules for the 9th mission are available at the Competition web site  along with a video summarizing the objectives of the 9th mission.  Mission 9 focuses on fully autonomous flight using ONLY onboard computing (no data links except for kill switch and safety pilot override) while avoiding obstacles and other aerial robots over a 3 km route, to replace a 2 kg (4.4 pound), approximately 1m (39 inch) long communications module on the mast of a moving platform (a boat in Sea State 2) and return home in under 9 minutes.

The 2020 International Aerial Robotics Competition and the beginning of mission 9 was postponed due to the COVID-19 pandemic. As a way to allow teams to continue development of mission 9 systems, the organizers of the IARC created an online challenge to all registered mission 9 teams to develop simulations of mission 9 showing how their aerial robots would conduct the mission from beginning to end. The team from Indian Institute of Technology Bombay won the simulation challenge. The winning simulation allowed the user to launch a hexacopter mothership carrying a quadcopter daughtership with a special communications module gripper. The user could set flight parameters such as wind speed, wind direction, sea state, and the endurance (stored energy) for each of the flight systems.

Participants
Collegiate teams participating in the IARC have come primarily from the United States and the People's Republic of China, but also from Germany, England, Switzerland, Spain, Canada, Chile, Qatar, Iran, and India. Teams range in size from several students, up to twenty or more. Both undergraduate and graduate students populate the teams, but some teams have been composed entirely of undergraduates or postgraduates. Industry is not permitted to enter, but it may assist the student teams with funding and equipment.

Aerial robots

The aerial robots vary in design from fixed wing airplanes, to conventional helicopters, to ducted fans, to airships, and beyond to bizarre hybrid creations. Because the competition focuses on fully autonomous behavior, the air vehicle itself is of less importance.

Teams choosing to develop new air vehicle types have never won, as they are disadvantaged in comparison to those which adapt existing, working, air vehicles, and can therefore concentrate on performing the mission rather than developing something that will fly at all. As a result, adaptations of conventional rotary wing and fixed wing entries have always been the overall winners, with airships and ducted fans a close second.

Aerial robots must be unmanned and autonomous, and must compete based on their ability to sense the semi-structured environment of the competition arena. They may be intelligent or preprogrammed, but they must not be controlled by a remote human operator. Computational power need not be carried on the air vehicle itself. Computers operating from standard commercial power may be set up outside the competition arena boundary and uni- or bi-directional data may be transmitted to/from the vehicles in the arena. Size or weight constraints are normally placed on the aerial robots, which must be equipped with a method of manually activated remote override of the primary propulsion system.

Venues
The International Aerial Robotics Competition was first held on the campus of the Georgia Institute of Technology (first mission, 1991–1995). Walt Disney World's EPCOT Center asked that the competition move to its location for the second mission, where it was held at the entrance to the park during 1996 and 1997. The U.S. Department of Energy's Hazardous Material Management and Emergency Response (HAMMER) training facility then brought the IARC to Richland WA from 1998 to 2000 for the conduct of the third mission. The fourth mission began in 2001 at the U.S. Navy's Webster Field in Maryland, but was moved to the Canada Olympic Village (Calgary, Canada) the following year because Webster Field was unsuitable. Weather, difficulty in airspace management, and extreme electromagnetic interference drove the IARC to an ideal venue where these issues could be managed: the U.S. Army's Fort Benning Soldier Battle Lab, McKenna MOUT site. For the fourth mission scenarios, the existence of the uninhabited McKenna village provides the perfect venue.  Due to the nature of the challenge, the fifth mission took place in an indoor location at the University of Puerto Rico at Mayagüez.  The sixth mission was initiated in the coliseum on the campus of the University of Puerto Rico at Mayagüez during August 2010, however the sixth mission was moved to Grand Forks, North Dakota beginning in 2011.  A second venue was established in Beijing China beginning in 2012.  This "Asia/Pacific Venue" serves the Asian and Australian continents while the "American Venue" serves the American, European, and African continents.  Teams are free to enter the competition at either venue.  Beginning in August 2012, the two venues conducted the sixth mission under the same set of rules.   The seventh mission was begun at the McAmish Pavilion on the campus of the Georgia Institute of Technology (American Venue) and in Yantai, Shandong Province, China (Asia/Pacific Venue) during August 2014.  The 8th Mission American Venue was held on the campus of the Georgia Institute of Technology in Atlanta, Georgia, and the Asia/Pacific Venue was conducted at the Yunnan Innovation Institute of Beihang University in Kunming China, during 2019.

Prizes
IARC prizes have traditionally been "winner take all", although during the competition's early years monetary progress awards were given to further development of the best performers. With the fourth mission it was realized that there would be no quick winners, and that several years of development would be required by each of the teams. Therefore, an incremental "growing prize pot" was established, to which the Association for Unmanned Vehicle Systems International Foundation adds another US$10,000 each year. The 2008 prize level was set at a total of $80,000. Any team completing the fourth mission in under 15 minutes would receive the entire $80,000 prize, otherwise the prize would be distributed based on 2008 competitor performance most closely approaching the 15-minute mission goal. By 2008, Levels 1 through 3 of the fourth mission had been demonstrated, proving that all required aerial robotic behaviors were possible, but by the end of the 2008 event, no single team was able to sequentially and seamlessly demonstrate all behaviors in under 15 minutes. The $80,000 was therefore divided between the ten finalists: (Georgia Institute of Technology received $27,700; Virginia Polytechnic Institute & State University $17,700; and Embry Riddle/DeVry Calgary $12,200, with the remainder shared between the other finalists based on merit).  $10,000 was awarded to a team from the Massachusetts Institute of Technology in 2009 which, in addition to receiving the AUVSI-sponsored prize award, also received their $1,000 application fee back under the incentive program outlined in the Official IARC Rules for 2009 which stated that any team completing the fifth mission during the first year of the mission, would receive a full rebate of their application fee. In August 2013, a team from Tsinghua University completed the entire sixth mission, thereby winning $40,000.

Spin offs
The competition creator, Robert Michelson, is past President of the Association for Unmanned Vehicle Systems International (AUVSI).
The IARC was first established with seed money for logistics and a grand prize that was backed by the Association.  After the initial success and tremendous media attention garnered by the IARC, the AUVSI launched the Intelligent Ground Vehicle Competition  a few years later in Detroit, MI. This was organized by AUVSI Board member, Jerry Lane who worked at the U.S. Army Tank Automotive Command at the time. In 1998, the underwater community was represented when AUVSI and the U.S. Office of Naval Research teamed up to offer the first International Autonomous Underwater Vehicle Competition which is held annually in the U.S. All of these competitions, land, sea, and air, have at their core, "full autonomy" as a distinctive characteristic. The Association for Unmanned Vehicle Systems International Foundation continues to support these competitions with logistics and prize money although there are numerous industry co-sponsors as well.

References

Selected IARC reports and publications
 Michelson, R.C., “Autonomous Aerial Robots,” Unmanned Systems, Volume 29 - No. 10, October 2011, Association for Unmanned Vehicle Systems International, Washington, D.C., pp 38–42
 Howe, J., Vogl, M., Banik, J., et al., "Design and Development of South Dakota School of Mines and Technology’s Aerial Robotic Reconnaissance System", 1994 Proceedings of the AUVSI.
 Chapuis, J., Eck,C., Geering, H.P., Mudra, R., "The Swiss Entry into the 1996 International Aerial Robotics Competition," 1996 Proceedings of the AUVSI, July 1996, Orlando, FL, pp. 947–953
 Padgett, W.T.,"Teaching design through design competition," Frontiers in Education Conference- Teaching and Learning in an Era of Chang, 27th Annual Conference Proceedings, 5–8 November 1997, Vol.3, pp. 1477–1480
 Koo, T.J., Shim, D.H., Shakernia, O., Sinopoli, B., Ma, Y., Hoffman, F., Sastry, S., "Hierarchical Hybrid System Design on Berkeley Unmanned Autonomous Aerial Vehicle," 1998 Proceedings of the AUVSI, July 1998
 Greer, D., McKerrow, P., Abrantes, J., "Robots in Urban Search and Rescue Operations," Proceedings of the 2002 Australasian Conference on Automation, Auckland, Australian Robotics and Automation Association, 27–29 November 2002, pp. 25–30
 Proctor, A.A., Kannan, S.K., Raabe, C., Christophersen, H.B., and Johnson, E.N., “Development of an Autonomous Aerial Reconnaissance System at Georgia Tech,” Proceedings of the Association for Unmanned Vehicle Systems International Unmanned Systems Symposium & Exhibition, 2003.

External links
Official IARC web site - The official web site for the International Aerial Robotics Competition.  (Retrieved 26 February 2018)
Official Rules for the current Mission - Rules for the current Mission and entry information  (Retrieved 26 February 2018)
Information about past missions - Information about past mission  (Retrieved 26 February 2018)

Engineering competitions
Robotics competitions
Recurring events established in 1991